The 2013 British Figure Skating Championships was held from 26 November to 2 December 2012 in Sheffield. Medals were awarded in the disciplines of men's singles, ladies' singles, pair skating, and ice dancing on the senior, junior, and novice levels. The results were among the criteria to determine the British teams for the 2013 World Championships, 2013 European Championships, and 2013 World Junior Championships.

Medalists

Senior

Junior

Novice

Senior results

Men

Ladies

Pairs

Ice dancing

External links
 2013 British Championships results

2013
2012 in figure skating
2013 in figure skating
Figure Skating Championships,2013
Figure Skating Championships,2013